Jerome Hayden "Jay" Powell (born February 4, 1953) is an American attorney and investment banker who has served as the 16th chair of the Federal Reserve since 2018. 

After earning a degree in politics from Princeton University in 1975 and a Juris Doctor from Georgetown University Law Center in 1979, he moved to investment banking in 1984, and worked for several financial institutions, including as a partner of The Carlyle Group. In 1992, Powell briefly served as under secretary of the Treasury for domestic finance under President George H. W. Bush. Powell left Carlyle Group in 2005 and founded Severn Capital Partners, a private investment firm. He was a visiting scholar at the Bipartisan Policy Center from 2010 to 2012, before returning to public service.

He became a member of the Federal Reserve Board of Governors after being nominated to the post by President Barack Obama in 2012, he was subsequently elevated to chairman by President Donald Trump (succeeding Janet Yellen), and renominated to the position by President Joe Biden.
Powell built his reputation in Washington during the Obama administration as a consensus-builder and problem-solver.

Powell received bipartisan praise for the actions taken by the Federal Reserve in early 2020 to combat the financial effects of the COVID-19 pandemic. As the Federal Reserve continued to apply high levels of monetary stimulus to further raise asset prices and support growth, some observers perceived a disconnect between asset prices and the economy. Powell has responded by arguing that supporting the Fed's dual mandate of stable prices and full employment outweighed concern over high asset prices.  Time said the scale and manner of Powell's actions had "changed the Fed forever" and shared concerns that he had conditioned Wall Street to unsustainable levels of monetary stimulus to artificially support high asset prices. In November 2020, Bloomberg News called Powell "Wall Street's Head of State," as a reflection of how dominant Powell's actions were on asset prices and how profitable his actions were for Wall Street.

Nearing the end of his first year in the White House, President Biden nominated Powell for a second term as Federal Reserve Chair, and the Senate Banking Committee approved of his renomination with only one dissenting vote; he was confirmed to a second term in an 80-19 vote on May 12, 2022. Following President Biden's renomination of Powell, the Fed Chairman retired his previous words "transitory inflation", and indicated a reduction in Quantitative easing (QE) and Mortgage-backed security (MBS) purchases due to high inflation,  with the Consumer Price Index (CPI) reading in November 2021 having reached 6.8% according to the Bureau of Labor Statistics, the highest level in 40 years.

Early life and education
Powell was born on February 4, 1953, in Washington, D.C., as one of six children to Patricia (née Hayden; 1926–2010) and Jerome Powell (1921–2007), a lawyer in private practice. His maternal grandfather, James J. Hayden, was Dean of the Columbus School of Law at Catholic University of America and later a lecturer at Georgetown Law School. He has five siblings: Susan, Matthew, Tia, Libby, and Monica.

In 1972, Powell graduated from Georgetown Preparatory School, a Jesuit university-preparatory school. He received a Bachelor of Arts in politics from Princeton University in 1975, where his senior thesis was titled "South Africa: Forces for Change". In 1975–76, he spent a year as a legislative assistant to U.S. Senator Richard Schweiker of Pennsylvania, a member of the Republican Party.

Powell earned a Juris Doctor degree from Georgetown University Law Center in 1979, where he was editor-in-chief of the Georgetown Law Journal.

Career

Legal and investment banking
In 1979, Powell moved to New York City and became a clerk to Judge Ellsworth Van Graafeiland of the United States Court of Appeals for the Second Circuit. From 1981 to 1983, Powell was a lawyer with Davis Polk & Wardwell, and from 1983 to 1984, he worked at the firm of Werbel & McMillen.

From 1984 to 1990, Powell worked at Dillon, Read & Co., an investment bank, where he concentrated on financing, merchant banking, and mergers and acquisitions, rising to the position of vice president.

Between 1990 and 1993, Powell worked in the United States Department of the Treasury, at which time Nicholas F. Brady, the former chairman of Dillon, Read & Co., was the United States Secretary of the Treasury. In 1992, Powell became the Under Secretary of the Treasury for Domestic Finance after being nominated by George H. W. Bush. During his stint at the Treasury, Powell oversaw the investigation and sanctioning of Salomon Brothers after one of its traders submitted false bids for a United States Treasury security. Powell was also involved in the negotiations that made Warren Buffett the chairman of Salomon.

In 1993, Powell began working as a managing director for Bankers Trust. He left in 1995 after the bank suffered irreparable reputational damage when some complex derivative transactions caused large losses for major corporate clients. He then went back to work for Dillon, Read & Co. From 1997 to 2005, Powell was a partner at The Carlyle Group, where he founded and led the Industrial Group within the Carlyle U.S. Buyout Fund. After leaving Carlyle, Powell founded Severn Capital Partners, a private investment firm focused on specialty finance and opportunistic investments in the industrial sector. In 2008, Powell became a managing partner of the Global Environment Fund, a private equity and venture capital firm that invests in sustainable energy.

Between 2010 and 2012, Powell was a visiting scholar at the Bipartisan Policy Center, a think tank in Washington, D.C., where he worked on getting Congress to raise the United States debt ceiling during the United States debt-ceiling crisis of 2011. Powell presented the implications to the economy and interest rates of a default or a delay in raising the debt ceiling. He worked for a salary of $1 per year.

Federal Reserve Board of Governors (2012–2018)

In December 2011, along with Jeremy C. Stein, Powell was nominated to the Federal Reserve Board of Governors by President Barack Obama. The nomination included two people to help garner bipartisan support for both nominees since Stein's nomination had previously been filibustered. Powell's nomination was the first time that a president nominated a member of the opposition party for such a position since 1988. He took office on May 25, 2012, to fill the unexpired term of Frederic Mishkin, who resigned. In January 2014, he was nominated for another term, and, in June 2014, he was confirmed by the United States Senate in a 67–24 vote for a 14-year term ending January 31, 2028.

Powell was a skeptic of round 3 of quantitative easing (or QE3), initiated in September 2012, although he eventually voted for it.

In 2013 Powell endorsed financial regulation to end the problem of institutions that are too big to fail, while urging that it should be implemented carefully. In April 2017, he was assigned to head the bank oversight committee 

In a July 2017 speech, Powell said that in regard to Fannie Mae and Freddie Mac the status quo is "unacceptable" and that the current situation "may feel comfortable, but it is also unsustainable". He warned that "the next few years may present our last best chance" to "address the ultimate status of Fannie Mae and Freddie Mac" and avoid "repeating the mistakes of the past". Powell expressed concerns that, in the current situation, the government is responsible for mortgage defaults and that lending standards were too rigid, noting that these can be solved by encouraging "ample amounts of private capital to support housing finance activities".

In an October 2017 speech, Powell stated that higher capital and liquidity requirements and stress tests from the Dodd–Frank Wall Street Reform and Consumer Protection Act have made the financial system safer and must be preserved. However, he also stated that the Volcker Rule should be re-written to exclude smaller banks.

Federal Reserve Chairman (2018–present)

On November 2, 2017, President Donald Trump nominated Powell to serve as the chair of the Federal Reserve, replacing Janet Yellen at the helm of the central bank. On December 5, the Senate Banking Committee approved Powell's nomination to be chair in a 22–1 vote, with Senator Elizabeth Warren casting the lone dissenting vote. His nomination was confirmed by the Senate on January 23, 2018, by an 84–13 vote. Powell assumed office as chair on February 5, 2018.

Trump Administration (2018–2021)

One of Powell's first actions was to continue to raise US interest rates, as a response to the increasing strength of the US economy. He also announced that the Fed would reduce its asset portfolio from US$4.5 trillion to a range of US$2.5–3 trillion over four years in a process called quantitative tightening. This tight policy drew public criticism from President Trump, who expressed second thoughts about nominating Powell and said that the chair was too enthusiastic about raising rates. Financial assets of all classes declined over 2018 and markets erupted in volatility in December. Powell abandoned quantitative tightening in early 2019, leading to a recovery in asset prices. Trump continued to state, with increasing hostility, that Powell was not reacting quickly enough. As a trade war with China escalated over the summer of 2019, Trump called the Fed's policies "insane" and labelled Powell an "enemy." He privately discussed with White House counsel the possibility of firing Powell, which Powell dismissed. In an August interview, Trump said that he completely disagreed with Powell's approach and called for a sharp cut in interest rates.

In October 2019, as asset prices waned, Powell announced the Fed would return to expanding its balance sheet, which led to a global rally in assets. Powell said the Fed's actions were not quantitative easing, but some dubbed them as being QE4. Where Bernanke-era quantitative was conducted through outright purchases of assets, Powell's expansion operates through overnight repurchase agreements (repos) where the seller has the option to reverse the transaction. The Fed's primary dealers and other banks use the repo facilities to sell Treasury and agency securities in exchange for credit to supplement their cash on hand.

COVID-19 recession response

In early 2020, Powell launched an unprecedented series of actions to counter the financial market impact of the COVID-19 pandemic, which included a dramatic expansion of the Fed's balance sheet and introduction of new tools, including the direct purchase of corporate bonds, and direct lending programs. Powell emphasized monetary policy alone without an equivalent fiscal policy response from Congress would widen income inequality. Powell's actions earned him bi-partisan praise, including from Trump, who told Fox News that he was "very happy with his performance" and that "over the last period of six months, he's really stepped up to the plate".

On November 19, 2020, after disagreeing with Treasury Secretary Steve Mnuchin, Powell agreed to return unused crisis funds to the United States Treasury. Both he and Mnuchin then urged Congress to approve more stimulus.

Asset price inflation

To mitigate the financial market impact of the COVID-19 pandemic, Powell accepted asset price inflation as a consequence of Fed policy actions. Powell was criticized for using high levels of direct and indirect quantitative easing as valuations hit levels last seen at the peaks of previous bubbles.

The Fed's acceptance of asset price inflation from 2019 onwards resulted in levels of wealth inequality not seen in the United States since the 1920s. Fed asset purchases were also seen as contributing to the K-shaped recovery that emerged during the coronavirus pandemic, where the asset bubbles protected the wealthier segments of society from the financial effects of the pandemic, at the expense of most other segments, and particularly on the younger non-asset owning segments such as millennials. In January 2021, Edward Luce of the Financial Times warned that the Fed's use of asset purchases, and the resultant widening of wealth inequality, could lead to political and social instability in the United States, saying: "The majority of people are suffering amid a Great Gatsby-style boom at the top".

Powell's expansion of credit through repo contracts, seen as a new "Greenspan put," created large profits for Wall Street investment banks. In June 2020, Jim Grant likened Powell's policy to drug dealing, calling him "the Fed's Dr. Feelgood." In a September 2020 testimony, Powell said: "Our actions were in no way an attempt to relieve pain on Wall Street". By the end of 2020, Wall Street investment banks recorded their best year in history, and Bloomberg called 2020, ".. a great year for Wall Street, but a bear market for Humans". Mohamed A. El-Erian called Powell "a follower, not a leader", of markets.

Powell defended his actions saying: "I don't know that the connection between asset purchases and financial stability is a particularly tight one", and that he wasn't worried that the Fed's actions were creating asset bubbles.

In July 2020, CNBC host Jim Cramer said, "I'm sick and tired of hearing that we're in a bubble, that Powell's overinflating the price of stocks by printing money to keep the economy moving". The Washington Post called the Fed "addicted to propping up markets, even when there is no need". In August 2020, investors Leon Cooperman and Seth Klarman warned of a dangerous "speculative bubble", with market psychology "unhinged from market fundamentals".

In August 2020, Bloomberg News called Powell's policy "exuberantly asymmetric" (echoing Alan Greenspan's "irrational exuberance" quote from 1996), and that the "Powell Put" had become more extreme than the "Greenspan Put". Steven Pearlstein in The Washington Post said that Powell had "adopted a strategy that works like a one-way ratchet, providing a floor for stock and bond prices but never a ceiling", and that any attempt by Powell to abandon this strategy "will trigger a sharp sell-off by investors who have become addicted to monetary stimulus".

By December 2020, Powell's monetary policy, measured by the Goldman Sachs US Financial Conditions Index (GSFCI), was the loosest in the history of the GSFCI (goes back to 1987), and had created simultaneous asset bubbles across most of the major asset classes in the United States: For example, in equities, in housing, and in bonds. Cryptocurrencies also saw dramatic increases in price during 2020, leading Powell to win the 2020 Forbes Person Of The Year In Crypto.

The asset price boom during the pandemic attracted a generation of young investors who explicitly credited Powell for promoting froth in financial markets. Gathering in online communities like Reddit's r/wallstreetbets board, they discussed high-risk trades and shared memes that depicted "J-Pow" using the Fed's money printer to flood the economy.

In December 2020, Powell defended high asset prices by invoking the controversial Fed model, saying: "Admittedly P/Es are high but that's maybe not as relevant in a world where we think the 10-year Treasury is going to be lower than it's been historically from a return perspective". The author of the Fed model, Edward Yardeni, said Powell's actions could form the greatest financial bubble in history, while the Wall Street Journal described Powell's comparison as an attempt to "rewrite the laws of investing".

Biden administration (2021–present)

In April 2021, Powell reassured concerns over a potential housing bubble, similar to the one that preceded the Great Recession. He stated, "we don't see bad loans and unsustainable prices and that kind of thing."

In August 2021, Powell expected the Fed to reduce economic support later in the year.  In the past Powell has considered inflation transitory, a term Powell states should now be "retired". In response to widespread high inflation readings Jerome Powell has indicated an increase in the speed of tapering asset purchases, namely up to $30 billion per month. In Jerome Powell's confirmation hearing in 2022 he described inflation as being a "severe threat" to the US economic recovery due to "higher costs of essentials like food, housing and transportation". Prices for American consumers are rising at their fastest annual rate since June 1982. In response, the central bank aims to raise rates as soon as March 2022. The most recent December 2021 CPI reading hit 7%.

In light of his term as chair expiring in February 2022, many Democrats began to express opposition to Powell's reappointment. In August 2021, progressive Democrats, including Alexandria Ocasio-Cortez, called on President Joe Biden to replace Powell, criticizing him for failing to "mitigate the risk climate change poses to our financial system". In September 2021, Senator Elizabeth Warren, Democrat of Massachusetts, criticized Powell for his financial regulation track record and called him as a "dangerous man to head up the Fed." Powell was renominated for a second term by President Joe Biden on November 22, 2021. His initial nomination expired at the end of the year and was returned to President Biden on January 3, 2022.

President Biden presented his nomination to the Senate the following day. Hearings were held on Powell's nomination before the Senate Banking Committee on January 11, 2022. The committee favorably reported Powell's nomination to the Senate floor on March 16, 2022, in a 22-1 vote; Senator Elizabeth Warren was the lone member to vote against his nomination. His nomination for another term as chair was confirmed by the full U.S. Senate on May 12, 2022 in an 80-19 vote. He was sworn in for his second term as chair on May 23, 2022.

Personal life 
Powell married Elissa Leonard in 1985 at the Episcopal Washington National Cathedral. They have three children and live in Chevy Chase Village, Maryland, where Elissa is chair of the board of managers of the village. In 2010, Powell was on the board of governors of Chevy Chase Club, a country club.

Based on public filings, as of 2019 Powell's net worth was estimated to be in a range between $20 million and $55 million. Powell has served on the boards of charitable and educational institutions including DC Prep, a public charter school, the Bendheim Center for Finance at Princeton University, and The Nature Conservancy. He was also a founder of the Center City Consortium, a group of 16 parochial schools in the poorest areas of Washington, D.C.

Powell is a registered Republican.

See also

2020 stock market crash
China–United States trade war
COVID-19 recession
Greenspan put
Fed model
Financial market impact of the COVID-19 pandemic

References

External links

Official
Biography from the Federal Reserve
Federal Reserve main website

Other
 Statements and Speeches of Jerome H. Powell (Saint Louis Federal Reserve Database)
 

1953 births
Living people
20th-century American lawyers
21st-century American lawyers
Biden administration personnel
Chairs of the Federal Reserve
The Carlyle Group people
Davis Polk & Wardwell lawyers
Georgetown Preparatory School alumni
Georgetown University alumni
Lawyers from Washington, D.C.
Obama administration personnel
Princeton University alumni
Trump administration personnel
Washington, D.C., Republicans